Milledgeville is an unincorporated community in Harrison Township, Boone County, in the U.S. state of Indiana.

History
A post office was established at Milledgeville (spelled Millageville during the first year) in 1874, and remained in operation until it was discontinued in 1899.

Geography

References

Unincorporated communities in Boone County, Indiana
Unincorporated communities in Indiana
Indianapolis metropolitan area